Don Kiethly Butterfield (April 1, 1923 – November 27, 2006) was an American jazz and classical tuba player.

Biography
Butterfield began to play the tuba in high school. He wanted to play trumpet, but the band director assigned him to tuba instead. He joined the United States Army Air Forces and reached the rank of technician fifth grade. After serving in the U.S. Military from 1942–46, he studied the instrument at the Juilliard School.

Butterfield started his professional career in the late 1940s playing for the CBS and NBC radio networks. He played in orchestras, including the American Symphony, on albums by Jackie Gleason until he became a full  time member at the Radio City Music Hall.

In the 1950s, Butterfield switched to jazz, backing such musicians as Dizzy Gillespie, Frank Sinatra, Charles Mingus, Rahsaan Roland Kirk, Jimmy Smith, and Moondog. He led his own sextet for a 1955 album on Atlantic Records and played at the 1958 Newport Jazz Festival.

In the 1970s, he worked as a session musician. He played on recordings for a variety of artists and on television and film soundtracks, including The Godfather Part II.

The Grove Dictionary of Music calls Butterfield's playing style, "uncommonly florid, a skill that made him of value as a jazz musician... He was one of the first modern jazz players who, rather than simply marking out the bass line, rediscovered the possibility of bringing to the instrument a facility akin to that of a trumpeter."

Butterfield played an 8-foot-long trumpet on the May 21, 1962 episode of the I've Got a Secret television program (season 10, episode 519).video

Butterfield suffered a stroke in 2005, which left him unable to play, and he died in 2006 from a stroke-related illness.

Discography

As sideman
With Cannonball Adderley
African Waltz (Riverside, 1961)
Domination (Capitol, 1965)
With Nat Adderley
Autobiography (Atlantic, 1964)
With David Amram
Subway Night (RCA, 1972)
With Bob Brookmeyer
Brookmeyer (Vik, 1956)
Jazz Concerto Grosso (ABC-Paramount, 1957) with Gerry Mulligan and Phil Sunkel 
Portrait of the Artist (Atlantic, 1960)
With Kenny Burrell
Blues - The Common Ground (Verve, 1968)
Night Song (Verve, 1969)
With Donald Byrd
Jazz Lab (Columbia, 1957) - with Gigi Gryce
I'm Tryin' to Get Home (Blue Note, 1965)
With Teddy Charles
Word from Bird (Atlantic, 1957)
With Jimmy Cleveland
Cleveland Style (EmArcy, 1958)
A Map of Jimmy Cleveland (Mercury, 1959)
With Bill Evans
Symbiosis (MPS, 1974)
With Art Farmer
Brass Shout (United Artists, 1959) 
Baroque Sketches (Columbia, 1967)
With Maynard Ferguson 
 The Blues Roar (Mainstream, 1965)With Dizzy GillespieGillespiana (Verve, 1960)
Carnegie Hall Concert (Verve, 1961)With Urbie GreenAll About Urbie Green and His Big Band (ABC-Paramount, 1956)
With Coleman Hawkins
The Hawk in Hi Fi (RCA Victor, 1956)With Jimmy HeathSwamp Seed (Riverside, 1963)With Roland KirkThe Roland Kirk Quartet Meets the Benny Golson Orchestra (Mercury, 1963)With John LewisEssence (Atlantic, 1962)With Arif MardinJourney (Atlantic, 1974)With Gil Mellé5 Impressions of Color (Blue Note, 1955)
Gil's Guests (Prestige, 1963)With Charles MingusThe Black Saint and the Sinner Lady (Impulse!, 1963)
Mingus Mingus Mingus Mingus Mingus (Impulse!, 1963)With the Modern Jazz QuartetPlastic Dreams (Atlantic, 1971)With James MoodyMoody with Strings (Argo, 1961)
Moody and the Brass Figures (Milestone, 1966)With Wes MontgomeryMovin' Wes (Verve, 1964)With Lee MorganDelightfulee (Blue Note, 1966)With Oliver NelsonImpressions of Phaedra (United Artists Jazz, 1962)
The Kennedy Dream (Impulse!, 1967)With Oscar PetersonBursting Out with the All-Star Big Band! (Verve, 1962)With Sonny RollinsSonny Rollins and the Big Brass (Metro Jazz, 1958)With Lalo SchifrinNew Fantasy (Verve, 1964)
Once a Thief and Other Themes (Verve, 1965)With Jimmy SmithThe Cat (Verve, 1964)
Hoochie Coochie Man (Verve, 1966)With Billy TaylorMy Fair Lady Loves Jazz (Impulse!, 1957)With Clark TerryTop and Bottom Brass (Riverside, 1959)With The Thad Jones / Mel Lewis OrchestraNew Life (A&M, 1975)With Cal TjaderSeveral Shades of Jade (Verve, 1963)With Stanley Turrentine'Nightwings'' (Fantasy, 1977)

References
 Acclaimed tuba player dies, Associated Press, November 29, 2006 (retrieved via FOXNews on January 31, 2020).

External links

Arlington National Cemetery

1923 births
2006 deaths
United States Army Air Forces personnel of World War II
American session musicians
American jazz tubists
American male jazz musicians
American classical tubists
Juilliard School alumni
People from Clifton, New Jersey
People from Centralia, Washington
20th-century American musicians
20th-century classical musicians
20th-century American male musicians
United States Army Air Forces soldiers
Jazz musicians from Washington (state)